Naknek Air Force Base is a former United States Air Force base located just southeast of King Salmon, in the Bristol Bay Borough of the U.S. state of Alaska. Following its closure, it has since been redeveloped into King Salmon Airport.

The United States Army Air Corps built Naknek Air Base in 1941.  The military established a rest and recreation camp at the Naknek River Rapids called Rapids Camp, and another at the west end of Naknek Lake called Lake Camp. In the 1950s, the base was renamed King Salmon Air Station.

See also

 Alaska World War II Army Airfields
 Air Transport Command
 Northwest Staging Route

References 

 

Installations of the United States Air Force in Alaska
Airports in Bristol Bay Borough, Alaska
Airfields of the United States Army Air Forces in Alaska
Airfields of the United States Army Air Forces Air Transport Command in Alaska